Purav Raja and Divij Sharan were the defending champions but only Sharan chose to defend his title, partnering Mikhail Elgin. Sharan lost in the first round to Evan King and Lucas Miedler.

Tomislav Brkić and Ante Pavić won the title after defeating Pedro Martínez and Adrián Menéndez Maceiras 6–1, 7–6(7–5) in the final.

Seeds

Draw

References
 Main Draw

KPIT MSLTA Challenger - Doubles
2017 Doubles